Rio Rancho Public Schools is a school district based in Rio Rancho, New Mexico, United States. Rio Rancho Public Schools serves the municipality of Rio Rancho. The school district has a total of 18 schools. The district has two high schools, two alternative high schools, four middle schools, 10 elementary schools, and one preschool.

The district, with the vast majority of its land in Sandoval County, serves most of Rio Rancho and almost all of Rio Rancho Estates. A very small portion of the district extends into Bernalillo County.

History
Prior to 1997 students in the school district attended Albuquerque Public Schools for high school. The first high school, Rio Rancho High School, opened in 1997.

Schools

High schools
 Rio Rancho High School
 V. Sue Cleveland High School (opened August 2009)
 Independence High School

Middle schools
 Eagle Ridge Middle School
 Lincoln Middle School
 Mountain View Middle School
 Rio Rancho Middle School

Elementary schools
 Cielo Azul Elementary School
 Colinas del Norte Elementary
 Enchanted Hills Elementary
 E. Stapleton Elementary
 Joe Harris Elementary
 Maggie M. Cordova Elementary
 Martin Luther King, Jr. Elementary
 Puesta del Sol Elementary
 Rio Rancho Elementary
 Sandia Vista Elementary
 Vista Grande Elementary

Pre-schools
 Shining Stars Preschool

2019 attempted shooting
On February 14, 2019, V. Sue Cleveland High School was the site of a shooting; however, no one was injured. It was later reported that a 16-year-old boy had fired a gun on school grounds after threatening to kill his ex-girlfriend and others.

References

External links
 Official website

School districts in New Mexico
Rio Rancho, New Mexico
Education in Sandoval County, New Mexico
Education in Bernalillo County, New Mexico
School districts established in 1994